Harold Parker (9 April 1917 – 7 August 2008) was a British wrestler. He competed in the men's freestyle flyweight at the 1948 Summer Olympics.

References

External links
 

1917 births
2008 deaths
British male sport wrestlers
Olympic wrestlers of Great Britain
Wrestlers at the 1948 Summer Olympics
Place of birth missing